Dino Pagliari (born 27 January 1957) is an Italian professional former footballer and manager.

Career

Footballer

As a footballer, he played several seasons in Serie A like his younger brother Giovanni. He played for Fiorentina in the late 1970s, before closing his career in lower divisions.

Coach

As a coach, he obtained his most important results managing Frosinone and Ravenna, which led to a promotion in Serie B (season 2006–07).

He currently holds a soccer school in the region of Marche.

On 27 December 2014 he replaced Franco Lerda as manager of U.S. Lecce.

On 9 December 2016 he was hired by the Viterbese Castrense.

References

1957 births
Living people
People from Macerata
Italian footballers
Serie A players
S.S. Maceratese 1922 players
ACF Fiorentina players
S.P.A.L. players
Ternana Calcio players
L.R. Vicenza players
Association football midfielders
Italian football managers
U.S. Fermana managers
U.S. Alessandria Calcio 1912 managers
S.S. Chieti Calcio managers
Frosinone Calcio managers
Ravenna F.C. managers
S.S. Virtus Lanciano 1924 managers
Pisa S.C. managers
U.S. Lecce managers
A.S. Viterbese Calcio managers
A.S. Gubbio 1910 managers
Sportspeople from the Province of Macerata
Footballers from Marche